Opae is a village in the municipality of Lipkovo, North Macedonia.

Demographics
According to the statistics of the Bulgarian ethnographer Vasil Kanchov from 1900, 150 inhabitants lived in Opae, 100 Romani and 50 Muslim Albanians. As of the 2021 census, Opae had 1,169 residents with the following ethnic composition:
Albanians 1,508
Persons for whom data are taken from administrative sources 77
Macedonians 32
Others 2

According to the 2002 census, the village had a total of 1996 inhabitants. Ethnic groups in the village include:

Albanians 1818
Macedonians 138
Serbs 38
Others 2

References

External links

Villages in Lipkovo Municipality
Albanian communities in North Macedonia